Saint-Méen is a commune in the Finistère department of Brittany in north-western France.

Population
Inhabitants of Saint-Méen are called in French Mévennais.

See also
Communes of the Finistère department
Roland Doré sculptor. Sculptor of Saint-Méen calvary

References

Mayors of Finistère Association

External links

Communes of Finistère